is a series of Japanese films by CineRocket, it consists of six straight-to-video releases by independent filmmakers via a brief but exclusive run at the minuscule Shimokitazawa cinema in Tokyo. The six films were conceived as low budget exercises to explore the benefits afforded by the low-cost Digital Video medium such as the increased mobility of film and the low-lighting conditions available to the filmmakers.

All six volumes are produced by Reiko Arakawa and Susumu Nakajima with Akira Saitō and Hisanori Endō serving as executive producers on all six volumes.

Each film are officially titled as Love Cinema Vol. [number]: [Title of film]

External links
 Official site

2000s Japanese-language films
Japanese avant-garde and experimental films
2000s Japanese films